Albert Krog House is a historic home located at Washington, Franklin County, Missouri. It was built about 1850, and is a -story, five bay, central passage plan brick dwelling on a stone foundation.  It has a side-gable roof and jack arched door and window openings.  It originally had a three bay, side entry facade, which was expanded to its present form at a very early date.

It was listed on the National Register of Historic Places in 2000.

References

Houses on the National Register of Historic Places in Missouri
Houses completed in 1850
Buildings and structures in Franklin County, Missouri
National Register of Historic Places in Franklin County, Missouri